The 3235th Drone Squadron is a discontinued United States Air Force unit.  It was last active with the 3205th Drone Group, based at NAS Point Mugu, California.  It was discontinued on 1 January 1957.

History
Organized as "Detachment 2", 3201st Air Base Support Squadron, on 26 April 1950,  Mission was to maintain and operate provide services and material to support operations of  aviation activities and units.  Operated QB/DB-17 Flying Fortress drone/director aircraft drones as flying targets for the Naval Point Mugu developmental and evaluation tests.

The unmanned B-17 drones were guided by pilots flying in mothership B-17s and the drone aircraft were used as target practice by fighter jets using missiles. Since the missiles they used were without warheads the drones, when hit, were guided back to the ground. They were then repaired and reused for other missions, including ground to air attacks.

Inactivated in 1957 with the end of the B-17 target drone program.

Lineage
 Organized as 3235th Drone Squadron on 1 July 1953
 Discontinued on 1 January 1957

Assignments
 3205th Drone Group, 1 July 1953 – 1 January 1957

Stations
 NAS Point Mugu, CA. 1 July 1953 – 1 January 1957

Aircraft
 DB-17P Flying Fortress (Director Aircraft)
 QB-17L Flying Fortress (Drone Aircraft)
 QB-17N Flying Fortress (Drone Aircraft)

References 

 E-mail communication, AFHRA, Lineage and Honors History, 3225th Drone Squadron, 10 August 2012

Military units and formations established in 1950
Military units and formations disestablished in 1957